"Just in Time" is a popular song with the melody written by Jule Styne and the lyrics by Betty Comden and Adolph Green. It was introduced by Judy Holliday and Sydney Chaplin in the musical Bells Are Ringing in 1956. Judy Holliday and Dean Martin sang the song in the 1960 film of Bells Are Ringing. Martin then recorded it for his 1960 album, This Time I'm Swingin'!. Tony Bennett recorded the song in 1956 and continued performing it until his retirement, at Radio City Music Hall, in 2021 at the age of 95.

Recorded versions
Peggy Lee recorded "Just in Time" in 1958 on Jump for Joy. 
Blossom Dearie recorded the song in 1959 on Blossom Dearie Sings Comden and Green. 
A recording of the song made by Tony Bennett on September 19, 1956 was a minor hit in 1956.
Frank Sinatra - for his album Come Dance with Me! (1959)
Eddie Fisher included the song on his 1961 LP of Broadway musical tunes entitled Tonight with Eddie Fisher.
Singer actress Joan O'Brien turns in a rousing version of this song on a 1963 episode of the 1960s TV sitcom, The Dick Van Dyke Show. 
Barbra Streisand included it in her album The Third Album (1964)
It was recorded in the 1960s by Judy Garland, Sarah Vaughan and Nina Simone.
Vic Godard and Subway Sect - for his album Songs for Sale (1982).
Tony Bennett recorded it for a second time with Michael Bublé as part of his 2006 album Duets: An American Classic.
Rickie Lee Jones - for the album Pieces of Treasure (2023)

References

1956 songs
Pop standards
Songs from musicals
Songs with music by Jule Styne
Songs with lyrics by Betty Comden
Songs with lyrics by Adolph Green
Tony Bennett songs
Michael Bublé songs
Barbra Streisand songs